Autarchoglossa is a clade (evolutionary grouping) of squamates that includes skinks, anguimorphs, snakes, and relatives. Autarchoglossa is supported as a monophyletic grouping (i.e. a valid clade) by morphological features in living and extinct lizards and snakes. Some phylogenetic analyses based on molecular features such as DNA sequences in living squamates do not support Autarchoglossa.

The recent proposal of the Toxicofera clade places Iguania within Autarchoglossa, which is not supported by morphological analyses. Placing Iguania within Autarchoglossa may lead to confusion as Autarchoglossa means "free-tongued", and iguanians do not have this feature. To circumvent this, it has been proposed that Autarchoglossa be renamed to Unidentata (single egg-tooth, a feature both groups share) and be redefined to include Iguania.

The following are families classified within Autarchoglossa (excluding Iguania):

 Anguidae Gray, 1825 – alligator lizards, anguids, galliwasps, glass lizards
 Anniellidae Nopcsa 1928 – legless lizards
 Cordylidae Mertens, 1937 – girdle-tailed lizards
 Gerrhosauridae Fitzinger, 1843 - plated lizards
 Gymnophthalmidae Merrem, 1820 - spectacled lizards
 Helodermatidae Gray, 1837 – beaded lizards
 Lacertidae Gray, 1825 –  wall lizards, Old World racerunners
 Lanthanotidae Steindachner, 1877 – earless monitors
 Scincidae Gray, 1825 – skinks
 Teiidae Gray, 1827 – tegus, junglerunners, ground lizards, New World racerunners, whiptails
 Varanidae Hardwicke & Gray, 1827 – monitors
 Xantusiidae Baird, 1858 – night lizards
 Xenosauridae Cope, 1866 - knob-scaled lizards

References

Scincogekkonomorpha